Walking Shadows is a studio album by jazz saxophonist Joshua Redman. It was released in 2013 by Nonesuch Records.

Music and recording
The arrangements were written by Dan Coleman, Patrick Zimmerli, and Brad Mehldau. Mehldau was also the producer. Most of the tracks include strings, but some, including "Stop This Train" and "Let It Be", are small-group performances.

The album was recorded on September 27–29, 2012, at Avatar Studios in New York City. It was released by Nonesuch Records on May 7, 2013.

Reception
The AllMusic reviewer suggested that "These are some of the most nuanced, lyrical, and romantic recordings Redman has ever produced. " John Fordham wrote that "It's a beautifully played project, but perhaps a shade on the tasteful side for some jazzers."

Track listing

Personnel

 Joshua Redman – tenor saxophone
 Brad Mehldau – piano
 Larry Grenadier – bass
 Brian Blade – drums
 Dan Coleman - string arrangements, orchestra director
 Avril Brown – violin
 Christina Courtin – violin
 Karen Karlsrud – violin
 Ann Leathers – violin
 Katherine Livolsi-Landau – violin
 Joanna Maurer – violin
 Courtney Orlando – violin
 Yuri Vodovos – violin
 Vincent Lionti – viola
 Daniel Panner – viola
 Dov Scheindlin – viola
 Stephanie Cummins – cello
 Eugene Moye – cello
 Ellen Westermann – cello
 Timothy Cobb – bass
 Pamela Sklar – flute
 Robert Carlisle – French horn

Charts

References

External links
 

2013 albums
Joshua Redman albums
Nonesuch Records albums